Muaaz Tarabichi is a Syrian  otolaryngologist, lecturer, researcher, and author. He is recognized around the world as the father of endoscopic ear surgery. He is the co-founder of Tarabichi Stammberger Ear and Sinus Institute. He was elected as the chairman of the International Advisory Board of the American Academy of Otolaryngology–Head and Neck Surgery.

He is the recipient of the Annual Clinical Resident Research Award.

Early life and education
Tarabichi enrolled at the Damascus University School of Medicine, Syria in 1977, and in 1981, he went to AUC, BWI, where he studied for two years.

In 1984, Tarabichi started his residency training at McGill University, Montreal, Canada. He did a residency in General Surgery for a year, and after that, in Otolaryngology for four  years and obtained certification from the American Board of Otolaryngology in 1991.

Career
Tarabichi started his career in 1988 when he opened a private otolaryngology practice in Kenosha, Wisconsin. In 1991, Tarabichi received his specialty certification from the  American Board of Otolaryngology. After a decade, Tarabichi moved to Dubai, where he joined the American Hospital as the Head of Otolaryngology in 1998.

In 2020,  Tarabichi co-founded Tarabichi Stammberger Ear and Sinus Institute with Heinz Stammberger. This institution aims to bring forth advancement in endoscopic ear and sinus surgery. To facilitate such advancements, TSESI offers fully-funded fellowships to the trainees. The institute consists of a wet lab and broadcasting and video production facilities as well as surgical and clinical patient care.

Tarabichi has published many articles and was the editor of two North American otolaryngological clinics on EES. He continuously travelled and  lectured around the world on Endoscopic Ear Surgery and Transtympanic Eustachian.

Appointments & Membership
 Chairman of the Middle East Academy of Otolaryngology
 Editorial Board of Journal of International Advanced Otology
 Chair elect of the International Advisory Board at the American Academy of Otolaryngology-Head and Neck Surgery
 Past member Editorial Board of The Laryngoscope
 Past Coordinator for Continuing Medical Education at the ORL-HNS Society, Emirates Medical Association

Selected publications
 Deafness in the Developing World: The Place of Cochlear Implantation. Journal of Laryngology and Otology, 2008:122:877-880
 Endoscopic Management of Limited Attic Cholesteatoma. Laryngoscope, 2004;114:1157–1162
 Endoscopic Management of Cholesteatoma: long-term  results, 2000 Jun; 122(6):874-81
 Characteristics of sinus-related pain, 2000 Jun; 122(6):842-7
 Endoscopic Middle Ear Surgery, 1999 Jan; 108(1):39-46
 Endoscopic Management of Acquired Cholesteatoma,1997 Sep; 18(5):544-9
 Comparison of short nozzle and long nozzle spray in sinonasal drug delivery: a cadaveric study
 Ear, Nose & Throat , 2019; 10.1177
 Feasibility and Safety of Transtympanic Balloon Dilatation of Eustachian Tube
 Otology & Neurotology, 2018
 Cochlear implants in developing countries: practical and ethical considerations
 Current Opinion in Otolaryngology & Head and Neck Surgery, 2018
 The Role of Transtympanic. Dilatation of the. Eustachian Tube During Chronic. Ear Surgery.
 Otolaryngologic Clinics of North America, 2016

Awards
 1988-  AAO-HNS Award for Excellence in Original Investigation for his study on application of finite element methods
 1986- Montreal Medico-Surgical Society Annual Resident Research Award

References

External links
 

Living people
Syrian people
American otolaryngologists
1959 births